Boris Aleksandrovich Pozdnyakov (born 31 May 1962) is a Russian football coach and a former player.

Honours
 Soviet Top League winner: 1989.
 Soviet Top League runner-up: 1980, 1981, 1983, 1984, 1986, 1991.
 Soviet Top League bronze: 1982.
 1990 UEFA European Under-21 Football Championship winner.

International career
Podznyakov made his debut for USSR on 28 March 1984 in a friendly against West Germany. He played in the 1986 FIFA World Cup qualifiers.

External links
  Profile

1962 births
Footballers from Moscow
Living people
Soviet footballers
Soviet Union international footballers
Soviet Union under-21 international footballers
Russian footballers
Soviet expatriate footballers
Russian expatriate footballers
Expatriate footballers in Austria
FC Spartak Moscow players
FC Dynamo Moscow players
FC Torpedo Moscow players
FC Chernomorets Novorossiysk players
Soviet Top League players
Russian Premier League players
Association football defenders
FC Sportakademklub Moscow players